Population Control is the fourth studio album by East Coast hip hop producer Statik Selektah. The album was released on October 25, 2011. The album features guest appearances from Sean Price, Termanology, Big K.R.I.T., Freddie Gibbs, Mac Miller, Styles P, Saigon, Jared Evan, Action Bronson, Bun B, Talib Kweli, XV, Colin Munroe, Lil Fame, Pill, Reks, Mitchy Slick, Dom Kennedy, Strong Arm Steady, Skyzoo, Chuuwee, Nitty Scott, MC, Rapsody, Smoke DZA, Joell Ortiz, Brother Ali, Lecrae, DJ Premier, DJ Babu and Scram Jones among others. The album debuted at number 11 on the US Billboard Top Heatseekers chart in the first week of its release.

Critical reception 

Population Control was met with positive reviews from music critics. Edwin Ortiz of HipHopDX gave the album three and a half stars out of five, saying "Statik Selektah may cosign all the rappers present on Population Control, but it's evident that his approval doesn't necessarily translate to a pristine collaboration in every instance. Still, as an artist who has built his reputation on consistency, his latest effort is a fairly solid project that likewise keeps the embers of Hip Hop glowing with passion." Jesse Gissen of XXL gave the album an L, saying "The biggest problem with the album is Statik's need to include everyone in the party. A lot of the tracks felt too cluttered with MCs that lacked chemistry together ("Sam Jack" and "Down") and with 20 tracks, the LP dragged towards the middle before picking up steam at the end. Luckily for listeners, Statik's ability to flip a beat never disappoints, as he makes sure to keep heads nodding no matter whose turn it is on the mic. Hopefully, next time Statik will be a little more selective on whom he decides to include in the general population."

Nathan S. of DJBooth gave the album four out of five stars, saying "The explosion of wack rappers we're currently living through can often feel like it's threatening to take over, but trying to suppress them is a fool's approach. Like a zombie rap invasion, no matter how many you kill it will never be enough. Instead the only way to ensure the survival of the dope rap species is to strengthen from within, make the music indestructibly good. So, without exaggeration, Statik's not only put together a nice album, he's fired a powerful shot in the war to keep truly quality music alive. It's exactly the kind of Population Control the game so badly needs." Jon O'Brien of AllMusic gave the album three and a half stars out of five, saying "Of course, Population Control could have been released at any point over the last 20 years, but while it's not going to change the face of the hip-hop scene, it's a classy and authentic old-school affair which effortlessly brings together two of its very different generations."

Commercial performance
The album debuted at number 11 on the US Billboard Top Heatseekers chart in the first week of its release.

Track listing
All songs produced by Statik Selektah

Charts

References

2011 albums
Statik Selektah albums
Albums produced by Statik Selektah